Chaolian Subdistrict is a subdistrict of Pengjiang District, Jiangmen, Guangdong, China. It covers an area of 12.68 square kilometers, and has a registered population of 12,808 as of 2008.

History
Chaolian was a subdistrict called Hua'e Du of Xinhui District in Qing Dynasty.

During the Republic of China, the area belonged to Xinhui County's 4th District. In 1955, the area fell under the jurisdiction of the Waihai People's Commune. In 1961, the area was moved to the Hetang People's Commune.

In 1977, the area was placed under the jurisdiction of Jiangmen as the Chaolian People's Commune. In 1983, Chaolain was changed to a district, and in 1987 was changed again to a town. Chaolian was changed to a subdistrict in 2000.

Geography
Chaolian Subdistrict is located on a river island in the Xi River. The subdistrict is bordered by the town of Guzhen to its east, Waihai Subdistrict to its south, central Pengjiang District to its west, and the town of Hetang to its north.

Climate 
Chaolian has a subtropical monsoon climate.

Administrative divisions
Chaolian Subdistrict administers six residential communities: Tangbian Residential Community, Zhishan Residential Community, Fugang Residential Community, Lubian Residential Community, Tanbian Residential Community, and Zhigang Residential Community.

Economy
The subdistrict's budget for 2020 totaled ¥92.58 million, with the biggest expenditures being on education and social security.

Since the Reform and Opening of China, many overseas Chinese originally hailing from Chaolian have invested in the area.

With the completion of Chaolian Bridge and Xijiang Bridge, Chaolian Subdistrict has transport links with surrounding cities, like Foshan and Guangzhou.

Chaolian is called "The Island of Diamond" after Henghe Diamond Co. Ltd.(Jiangmen), which is located there. Other important businesses within the subdistrict include Xijiang View Food Street, and Jiangmen Polytechnic.

Tourism

Hongsheng Park is in Fugang. In the north of Chaolian island, facing Xijiang, it is the expansion of Hongsheng Buddha Hall in 1984. It covers an area of more than 15,000 square meters, with beautifully designed structures. The artificial lake is quiet and beautiful with bridges and pavilions. The park is full of plants, from roses to peach flowers, mellows to bamboos. The main historical sites are Hongsheng Buddha Hall, the Loving Mother Pavilion, and the Four-Eyes-Well.
Chaolian Beach Park is a place for barbecue, exercising, swimming, and relaxing.
Lubian Ancestral Hall is in Lubian. It is famous for its ancient Chinese style architecture. Now it serves as a small museum for exhibition of paintings and photographs of local artists.

Education

Chaolian Central Kindergarten is in Lubian, and it is the biggest kindergarten in Chaolian.
Yongsi Primary School is in Zhishan. It serves local children mainly.
Chaolian Central School has its primary school section and its junior high school section. It locates at Lubian.
Jiangmen Polytechnic is a higher education facility with a 30-year history, and it relocated in Chaolian in 2004.

References

Jiangmen